Walter Feodorovich Nouvel (1871–1949) was a Russian émigré art-lover and writer.  He co-wrote with Arnold Haskell a biography of Sergei Pavlovitch Diaghilev (Diaghileff. His Artistic and Private life), and was the ghost-writer of Igor Stravinsky's autobiography Chronique de ma Vie (Chronicle of my life). Nouvel fled the Soviet Union in 1919 and worked as secretary and factotum for Diaghilev's Ballets Russes.

Literature: Zil'bershtein, I.S. and V.A. Samkov, eds. Sergei Diagilev i russkoe iskusstvo, 2.vols. Moscow: Iskusstvo 1982. vol. 2, pp. 342–343.

References

1871 births
1949 deaths